Paul Schafer, Paul Schäfer, Paul Schaefer, Paul Shafer or Paul Shaffer may refer to:

  Paul Schafer, inventor of the Schafer automation system
 Paul Schäfer, a German sect leader
 Paul Schäfer (politician), a German politician
 Paul Schaefer (ice hockey), an ice hockey player
 Paul W. Shafer, an American politician
 Paul Shaffer, a Canadian musician